Alnwick Town Association Football Club is a football club based in Alnwick, Northumberland, England.

History
The club were established in 1879 as Alnwick United Services. They joined the North Northumberland League, winning it in 1898–99. In 1900 they were renamed Alnwick United Juniors and moved to St James' Park. In 1923 they joined the East Northumberland League, before switching to the Northern Alliance in 1935. The following year the club adopted its current name, and in 1937–38 they won the Northern Alliance for the first time. Following World War II the club enjoyed a sustained period of success, winning the Northern Alliance in 1962–63, 1963–64, 1965–66, 1967–68, 1968–69, 1969–70, 1970–71 and 1971–72, as well as the Challenge Cup in 1961–62, 1965–66, 1967–68, 1968–69 and 1970–71.

In 1982 the club joined the Northern League, becoming members of the new Division Two. In 1988–89 they were runners-up, earning promotion to Division One. However, after finishing eighth in their first season in Division One, they were second from bottom in 1990–91, resulting in relegation back to Division Two. The club remained in Division Two until 2006–07 when they finished bottom of the table and were relegated back to the Premier Division of the Northern Alliance. The club were Northern Alliance runners-up in the 2010–11 season, earning promotion to the Division Two of Northern League. In 2017–18 they finished bottom of Division Two and were relegated back to the Northern Alliance.

League history

Other teams
The club's reserve team joined Division Two of the Northern Alliance  in 2011, having previously played in the North Northumberland League. In 2015 they returned to the North Northumberland League. Although the reserve team subsequently dropped out of the league, they returned in 2017. At the end of the 2017–18 season the team were rebranded as the Development Squad. When the league folded in 2019, the team transferred to the North East Combination League. When the North Northumberland League was revived in 2020, the Development Squad rejoined. They were champions in 2020–21, after which they moved up to Division Three of the Northern Alliance.

Alnwick Town Ladies play in the North East Regional Women's League Premier Division. They previously won the Northumberland County League and Cup, before being promoted to the North East Regional Women's League Northern Division.

Honours
Northern Alliance
Champions 1937–38, 1962–63, 1963–64, 1965–66, 1967–68, 1968–69, 1969–70, 1970–71, 1971–72
Challenge Cup winners 1961–62, 1965–66, 1967–68, 1968–69, 1970–71
Subsidiary Cup Winners 1980–81
Durham Central League
League Cup winners 1964–65
North Northumberland League
Champions 1898–99
Northumberland Senior Benevolent Bowl
Winners 1986–87, 2009–10
Northumberland Amateur Cup
Winners 1971–72
North Northumberland Minor Cup
Winners 1903–04
Aged Miners Homes Cup winners
Winners 1936–37

Records
Best FA Cup performance: Third qualifying round, 1951–52, 1957–58
Best FA Trophy performance: Third qualifying round, 1990–91
Best FA Vase performance: Second round, 1975–76, 2014–15

See also
Alnwick Town A.F.C. players

References

External links
Official website

Alnwick
Football clubs in England
Football clubs in Northumberland
Association football clubs established in 1879
1879 establishments in England
North Northumberland Football League
East Northumberland League
Northern Football Alliance
Northern Football League